Invisible, Inc. (stylized as INVI?IBLE, INC.) is a turn-based tactics stealth video game incorporating elements of roguelike gameplay, developed by Canadian independent studio Klei Entertainment. The player acts as the remote operator for an espionage agency that has come under attack from multinational corporations, and directs agents in covert missions, acquiring resources and support in order to enable relocation of the agency's computer system to a safe haven within a limited amount of time.

The game was available for early access for Microsoft Windows and OS X from January 2014, a Linux build was later released. The full version was released for Windows, OS X, and Linux on May 12, 2015. A PlayStation 4 version was released on April 19, 2016, while a version for iOS devices was released on October 6, 2016. A Nintendo Switch version was released on June 15, 2020.

Gameplay

The game is a turn-based tactics based-game inspired by X-COM, with emphasis on stealth and espionage. In each playthrough, the player takes on the role of an agent handler for covert operations and has three days to prepare for their final mission. This is done by performing various missions across the globe to retrieve information, valuables, equipment and personnel, keeping cognizant of the amount of time taken for travel and missions within that three day period. The player selects two agents to perform these missions to start, and may be able to free other agents during missions; should one agent die during a mission, they remain dead for the remainder of the runthrough unless revived using a medkit consumable or dragged to the exit by another agent, while if all agents die, the game is over. The mission details and location layouts are procedurally generated for each run through, featuring a variety of objectives, obstacles, and difficulty.

Missions are played out in a turn-based manner. Each agent under the player's control has a limited number of action points each turn that allow them to move, open/close doors, take out guards silently, or perform other covert tasks. Additionally, the player may need to collect power to be able to use "Incognita", the hacking interface that allows them to disable alarms and security cameras or remove locks on safes. Once the player has completed their turn, any enemy forces move, and in most locations an alarm level is raised; with higher alarm levels, new security forces and threats will arrive, making the mission more difficult. Certain stations can let the player purchase upgrades or equipment for the agents to help in the mission, using collected in-game money. The objective of the mission depends on the facility type being infiltrated, usually requiring the player to retrieve a specific item from a secure location and escape, stealing as much money and equipment as possible along the way.

The game has a larger meta-game aspect, in that as they play and complete certain goals, they can unlock different agents with different skill sets or new default equipment to begin missions with in future playthroughs.

Plot
The game is set in year 2074, after megacorporations have overthrown the world's national governments and taken control. Invisible Inc. is a private intelligence agency providing services to corporations, performing infiltrations using field agents and a sophisticated AI system known as Incognita.

At the start of the game, Invisible Inc. is compromised by corporate soldiers, which leads to the headquarters as well as most agents and assets being lost, with only the agency's leader, two agents, the player, Monst3r, and Incognita escaping. Incognita can only be hosted in extremely powerful computer systems and cannot survive outside of them for more than 72 hours, so it becomes the agency's task to use that time to prepare for their final mission, where they will try to infiltrate the enemy's headquarters to access the computer system and insert Incognita. But, once she's uploaded it turns out she has been planning to exterminate the megacorporations, and ends with her using satellites (equipped with orbital lasers) to destroy their headquarters, killing thousands of people in the process. Incognita defies her removal from the new host computer and allows the agency's leader to leave unharmed.

Development
Invisible, Inc. was announced on July 2, 2013, in an interview with Rock, Paper, Shotgun's Nathan Grayson. A preview of the alpha version of the game was shown at the September PAX Prime 2013 expo. After playing the preview, Grayson commented that the game was very early in development, but that he "really enjoyed" his session with the game.

The game was originally titled Incognita but was renamed to Invisible, Inc. after developer Klei Entertainment found the new title was better received during focus testing. The name remains as part of the game as "Incognita" mode used to interact with the various electronic systems.

An alpha version of the game entered Early Access in January 2014. The game was added to the Steam Early Access program on August 20, 2014, and fully released on May 12, 2015. The game was released on the PlayStation 4, including the Contingency Plan content, on April 19, 2016. An iOS version of the base game was released on October 6, 2016, with plans to bring the downloadable content later. The Switch version was released on June 15, 2020.

Downloadable content (DLC) for the game, titled Invisible, Inc. Contingency Plan was released on November 12, 2015. The DLC adds agents, mission difficulty levels, missions, enemy types, weapons and items to the main game, in addition to an extended campaign.

Reception

Invisible, Inc. was named as a finalist for the Excellence in Design and the Seumas McNally Grand Prize for the 2015 Independent Games Festival.

Invisible, Inc. received positive reviews upon release. Aggregating review website Metacritic gave the PC version of the game 82/100 based on 45 reviews.

References

External links
 

2015 video games
Cyberpunk video games
Early access video games
IOS games
Linux games
Lua (programming language)-scripted video games
MacOS games
Nintendo Switch games
PlayStation 4 games
Video games with Steam Workshop support
Turn-based tactics video games
Video games developed in Canada
Indie video games
Video games featuring female protagonists
Video games set in the 2070s
Video games using procedural generation
Video games with downloadable content
Windows games
Spy video games
Stealth video games
Klei Entertainment games
Single-player video games